NHS Lothian is one of the 14 regions of NHS Scotland. It provides healthcare services in the City of Edinburgh, East Lothian, Midlothian and West Lothian areas. Its headquarters are at Waverley Gate, Edinburgh

Services
It is responsible for the care provided by around 29,000 staff at a number of locations:

 21 hospitals, including four major teaching hospitals
 126 GP practices
 180 community pharmacies
 173 dental practices
 112 ophthalmic practices

Community Health Partnerships
The Edinburgh Community Health Partnership (CHP) has responsibilities around delivering community health services and also addressing inequalities in Edinburgh for NHS Lothian.

When the CHPs were established in 2005 they provided a single management structure, taking over control of community services which were transferred under their control. On 1 April 2007, Edinburgh Community Health Partnership was formed by the merging of 2 CHPs: Edinburgh North and Edinburgh South.

NHS Lothian's Accident and Emergency

Accident and emergency departments are located within the Royal Infirmary of Edinburgh, St. John's Hospital and the Royal Hospital for Sick Children. Performance has been rated the poorest in Scotland. Only 89.4 percent of emergency patients were treated or admitted within four hours in November 2017.

Minor Injury Dept

The Western General Hospital has a nurse-staffed Minor Injury Dept. it is open every day of the year and treats, cuts, burns, infection and small bone breaks. It is an alternative to Accident and Emergency departments and helps to appropriately treat patients whilst helping to reduce unnecessary A & E attendance.

Hospitals

City of Edinburgh
Astley Ainslie Hospital
Chalmers Hospital
Corstorphine Hospital
Ellen's Glen House
Ferryfield House
Lauriston Building
Leith Community Treatment Centre
Liberton Hospital
Princess Alexandra Eye Pavilion
Royal Edinburgh Hospital
Royal Hospital for Sick Children 
Royal Infirmary of Edinburgh
Western General Hospital

East Lothian
Belhaven Hospital, Dunbar
Edington Cottage Hospital, North Berwick
Herdmanflat Hospital, Haddington
Roodlands General Hospital, Haddington

Midlothian
Midlothian Community Hospital, Bonnyrigg

West Lothian
St John's Hospital, Livingston
St Michael's Hospital, Linlithgow
Tippethill House Hospital, Whitburn

Headquarters
NHS Lothian was based at the Deaconess House until 2010 when it moved to Waverley Gate, an office development within the facade of the former GPO in the centre of Edinburgh.

History
It was established in 2001 as the 'umbrella' organisation for all Lothian health services.

There were also three NHS trusts operating in the area - Lothian University Hospitals, Lothian Primary Care and West Lothian Healthcare. The dissolution of these bodies in 2003-2004 meant that NHS Lothian would act as a single health authority, overseeing the planning and delivery of all the region's local health services.

Governance

Chief executive

The Chief Executive is Calum Campbell (as of June 2020).

Board members
The NHS Board members are:

 Brian Houston, Chairman
 Tim Davison, Chief Executive
 Alex Joyce, Employee Director
 Tracey Gillies, Medical Director
 Susan Goldsmith, Director of Finance
 Professor Alison McCallum, Director of Public Health and Health Policy
 Professor Alex McMahon, Nurse Director
 Fiona Ireland, Chair of the Area Clinical Forum
 Martin Hill, Vice Chair
 Michael Ash, Councillor Ricky Henderson, Alison Mitchell, Peter Murray, Carolyn Hirst, John Oates, Lynsay Williams, Dr Richard Williams, Professor Moira Whyte, Professor Tracy Humphrey, Angus McCann, Councillor John McGinty, Councillor Fiona O'Donnell, Councillor Derek Milligan, Martin Connor, Non Executive Board Members

Performance
Between April 2014 and February 2015 the board paid out almost £8 million to private hospitals for the treatment of more than 4,500 patients in order to meet waiting time targets. In an attempt to comply with the Scottish Treatment Time Guarantee, a 12-week target for inpatient or day-case patients waiting for treatment, the board spent £11.3 million on private hospital treatment for NHS patients in 2013-14.

References

External links 

 

 
Health in Lothian
Organisations based in Edinburgh
2001 establishments in Scotland